AD 65 (LXV) was a common year starting on Tuesday (link will display the full calendar) of the Julian calendar. At the time, it was known as the Year of the Consulship of Nerva and Vestinus (or, less frequently, year 818 Ab urbe condita). The denomination AD 65 for this year has been used since the early medieval period, when the Anno Domini calendar era became the prevalent method in Europe for naming years.

Events

By place

Roman Empire 
 April 19 – The freedman Milichus betrays the Pisonian conspiracy led by Gaius Calpurnius Piso to kill Emperor Nero and all the conspirators are arrested.
 An epidemic afflicts Rome.
 After a stage performance in which he appears and shocks the senatorial class considerably, Nero engages in a series of reprisals against Seneca the Younger and Tigellinus, pro-republican senators, and anyone else he distrusts. 
 Nero's pregnant wife, Poppea Sabina, dies from Nero kicking her stomach or while having a miscarriage.

By topic

Religion 

 Paul of Tarsus ordains Timothy as bishop of Ephesus (traditional date).
 Paul writes his first epistle to Timothy in Corinth; afterwards, he goes to Nikopoli to spend the winter. 
 In China, the first official reference to Buddhism is made.
 The first Christian community in Africa is founded by Mark, a disciple of Peter.
</onlyinclude>

Births 
 Philopappos, Greek prince of Commagene (d. AD 116)
 Tiberius Claudius Atticus Herodes, Greek aristocrat

Deaths 
 April 30 – Lucan, Roman poet and philosopher (b. AD 39)
 Faenius Rufus, Roman praetorian prefect (executed)
 Gaius Calpurnius Piso, Roman consul (approximate date)
 Gaius Julius Alpinus Classicianus, Roman procurator
 Jude the Apostle, Christian martyr (approximate date)
 Lucius Antistius Vetus, Roman consul and governor
 Lucius Junius Gallio Annaeanus, Roman politician
 Marcus Julius Vestinus Atticus, Roman politician
 Marcus Ostorius Scapula, Roman politician
 Plautius Lateranus, Roman politician (executed)
 Poppea Sabina, second wife of Nero (b. AD 30)
 Seneca the Younger, Roman statesman and tutor of Nero
 Simon the Zealot, Christian martyr (approximate date)

References 

0065

als:60er#65